Walter Allen Stosch (born August 18, 1936, in Fredericksburg, Virginia) is an American politician in the Republican Party. He served in the Virginia House of Delegates from 1983 until 1992, when he was elected to the Senate of Virginia. He was Majority leader 1998–2007, after which he was named Republican Leader Emeritus. He served as the  President Pro Tempore of the Senate for his final term, except for a six-month period when Democrats controlled the chamber. He represented the 12th district, made up of parts of Hanover and Henrico Counties. In 2009, responding to the request of constituent Em Bowles Locker Alsop, Stosch sponsored a monument to Virginia women in Capitol Square, which became law in 2010, and was unveiled in October 2018.

Personal life
Stosch was born and raised in the Northern Neck of Virginia. He served in the United States Army 1953–56, then attended the University of Richmond, where he received a B.S. degree in accounting in 1959. He passed the Certified Public Accountant exam and began practice in Richmond. In 1984, he received an MBA degree from the same school. He was also an adjunct professor at both Richmond and Virginia Commonwealth University.

He married Eleanor Herbert. They had two children, David and Karen, and four grandchildren, Sarah Stosch Stewart, Ashley Watson, Kelly Stosch Chaffin, and Brian Watson.

Notes

References

 (Constituent/campaign website)

External links

Project Vote Smart - Senator Walter A. Stosch (VA) profile
Follow the Money - Walter A Stosch
2005 2003 2001 1999 campaign contributions
Washington Post - Senate District 12 Race

1936 births
American accountants
Living people
Republican Party members of the Virginia House of Delegates
Politicians from Fredericksburg, Virginia
People from Henrico County, Virginia
University of Richmond alumni
University of Richmond faculty
Virginia Commonwealth University faculty
Republican Party Virginia state senators
21st-century American politicians
20th-century American politicians